William Edward Holyoke (March 13, 1868 – April 3, 1934) was an American sailor serving in the United States Navy during the Boxer Rebellion who received the Medal of Honor for bravery.

Biography
Holyoke was born March 13, 1868, in Groveton, New Hampshire, and after entering the navy he was sent as a Boatswain's Mate First Class to China to fight in the Boxer Rebellion.

He died April 3, 1934, and is buried in Charles Evans Cemetery in Reading, Pennsylvania. His grave can be found in section 67A, row 4, grave 41.

Medal of Honor citation
Rank and organization: Boatswain's Mate First Class, U.S. Navy. Born: 13 March 1868, Groveton, N.H. Accredited to: Illinois. G.O. No.: 55, 19 July 1901.

Citation:

In action with the relief expedition of the allied forces in China, 13, 20, 21 and 22 June 1900. During this period and in the presence of the enemy, Holyoke distinguished himself by meritorious conduct.

See also

List of Medal of Honor recipients
List of Medal of Honor recipients for the Boxer Rebellion

References
Inline

General

1868 births
1934 deaths
Burials at Charles Evans Cemetery
People from Coös County, New Hampshire
United States Navy Medal of Honor recipients
United States Navy sailors
American military personnel of the Boxer Rebellion
Boxer Rebellion recipients of the Medal of Honor